John David Dalton (January 15, 1942 – July 11, 2022) was a British born-American author and a founding editor of Rolling Stone magazine. He has written several books, including the cult classic James Dean, the Mutant King, as well as co-writing Paul Anka's autobiography My Way.

Awards and honors
Dalton, along with David Felton, won the Columbia School of Journalism Award for their interview with Charles Manson. He also won the Ralph J. Gleason Best Rock Book of the Year award for his book Faithfull.

Works
Dalton has written twenty-four books and a number of biographies on people such as James Dean, Jim Morrison, Janis Joplin, Sid Vicious, the Rolling Stones, and Andy Warhol. He is the co-author (with Jonathan Cott) of Get Back (Apple Books, 1969), a collection of conversation transcripts (with photos by Ethan Russell) documenting the making of the album Let It Be.  He is also the co-author of the autobiography of Steven Tyler, Does The Noise In My Head Bother You? (HarperCollins, 2011).

Dalton's has been managing the Australian band The Beef Wagooos in 2019. He was also a regular contributor to Portland radio station KBOO.

Personal life
John David Dalton was born to Kathleen Tremaine and John in London on January 15, 1942. His father was a doctor and his mother was an actress. He is the first cousin of actress Joanna Pettet. Dalton was raised in London and British Columbia as his father was a Canadian. He died from cancer in Manhattan on July 11, 2022, at the age of 80.

References

1942 births
2022 deaths
Rolling Stone people
American male non-fiction writers
English emigrants to the United States
English people of Canadian descent
Writers from London
American people of Canadian descent
English male non-fiction writers